Malaysia participated in the 2014 Asian Games in Incheon, South Korea from 19 September to 4 October 2014. Danyal Balagopal Abdullah was the chief of the delegation.

Media coverage
Malaysian satellite television provider Astro and Media Prima Group private broadcasters TV3 (Sistem Televisyen Malaysia Berhad) and TV9 (Ch-9 Media Sdn Bhd) held the broadcast rights of the 2014 Asian Games in the country. The latter two replaced Radio Televisyen Malaysia (last broadcast the 2010 edition) as the free-to-air right holders for the event. It was the only such case in Malaysian sports telecast, as Radio Televisyen Malaysia would later return to hold the free-to-air broadcast rights in 2018. Astro was also one of the production teams for host broadcaster Incheon Asian Games Host Broadcasting Management.

Medal summary

Medal table

Multiple medalists
Malaysian competitors that have won at least two medals.

Medalists

Aquatics

Diving

Men

Women

Swimming

Men

Women

Synchronised swimming

Women

Archery

Malaysia won its first medal in archery in Asian Games history through the trio of Khairul Anuar Mohamad, Haziq Kamaruddin and Atiq Bazil Bakri in the men's recurve team event.

Men's recurve

Men's compound

Athletics

Men
Field events

Women
Track event

Field event

Badminton

Individual

Doubles

Team

Bowling

Singles

Doubles

Trios

Team

All-events

Masters

Boxing

Men

Cricket

Men's tournament

Women's tournament

Cycling

Road

Track
Sprint

Omnium

Keirin

Equestrian

Jumping

Field hockey

Men's tournament

Group A

Semifinal

Bronze medal match

Ranked 4th in final standings

Women's tournament

Pool A

Fifth and sixth place classification

Ranked 5th in final standings

Football

Men's tournament

First round

Ranked 19th in final standings

Golf

Men

Gymnastics

Artistic
Women

Kabaddi

Men's tournament

Karate

Men

Women

Rugby sevens

Men's tournament

Women's tournament

Sailing

Men

Women

Open

Sepaktakraw

Men

Women

Shooting

Men

Shotgun

Women

Squash

Individual

Men's team

Pool B

Semifinal

Gold medal match

Women's team

Semifinal

Gold medal match

Table tennis

Singles

Doubles

Women's team

Taekwondo

Men

Women

Volleyball

Beach volleyball
Men

Weightlifting

Men

Wushu

Taolu

Sanshou

Notes

References
http://in.reuters.com/article/games-asian-malaysia-cuts-idINKBN0GI0CR20140818
http://www.bernama.com/bernama/v7/sp/newssports.php?id=1061359

Nations at the 2014 Asian Games
2014
Asian Games